Jaenisch is a surname. Notable people with the surname include:

Carl Jaenisch (1813–1872), Finnish and Russian chess player
Rudolf Jaenisch (born 1942), German cell biologist

Surnames from given names